The 2012 FIVB Women's Club World Championship was the sixth edition of the – since 2010 – annual event. It was held in Doha, Qatar from October 13 to 19, 2012.

Qualification

Pools composition

Squads

Venue

Pool standing procedure
Match won 3–0 or 3–1: 3 points for the winner, 0 points for the loser
Match won 3–2: 2 points for the winner, 1 point for the loser
In case of tie, the teams will be classified according to the following criteria:
number of matches won, sets ratio and points ratio

Preliminary round
All times are Arabia Standard Time (UTC+3).

Pool A

|}

|}

Pool B

|}

  
|}

Final round
All times are Arabia Standard Time (UTC+3).

Bracket

Semifinals

|}

3rd place

|}

Final

|}

Final standing

Awards
MVP:  Sheilla Castro (Sollys Nestlé Osasco)
Best Scorer:  Sheilla Castro (Sollys Nestlé Osasco)
Best Spiker:  Thaísa Menezes (Sollys Nestlé Osasco)
Best Blocker:  Jessica Jones (Lancheras de Cataño)
Best Server:  Angelina Grün-Hübner (Rabita Baku)
Best Setter:  Elif Ağca (Fenerbahçe)
Best Receiver:  Jaqueline Carvalho (Sollys Nestlé Osasco)
Best Libero:  Camila Brait (Sollys Nestlé Osasco)

References

External links
Official Website of the 2012 FIVB Club World Championship

2012 FIVB Women's Club World Championship
FIVB Women's Club World Championship
FIVB Women's Club World Championship
FIVB Volleyball Women's Club World Championship
Sports competitions in Doha